Signify may refer to:
Signify (company), a Dutch multinational lighting corporation
Signify (album), a 1996 studio album by Porcupine Tree